The Jagdishpur Reservoir is a reservoir in Jahadi Village Development Committee, Kapilvastu District, Nepal which was named after Er. Jagadish Jha who designed and supervised the construction of Banaganga dam.
it is the largest reservoir in the country and an important wetland site.

The Jagdishpur Reservoir is listed on the List of Ramsar Wetlands of International Importance, as defined by the Ramsar Convention.

History
At Jakhira Lake during the 1970s, Jagdishpur was created to provide water to crops. In 2003, the reservoir was declared a Ramsar site. Despite this, its birds and other fauna have not yet been studied in great detail.

Fauna
The silt and nutrients deposited in the reservoir favour the growth of reed beds, which provide shelter for several endangered species. The habitat of the reservoir and its surroundings is important for resident, wintering and migrating wetland birds, comprising 45 different bird species. Five of these are globally threatened species. The surrounding cultivated land also provides habitat for a large numbers of birds. Some of the notable species documented in the area include:
Asian openbill (Anastomus oscitans)
Black-winged kite (Elanus axillaris)
Egyptian vulture (Neophron percnopterus), a globally threatened species
Greater spotted eagle (Clanga clanga), a globally threatened species
Indian spotted eagle (Clanga hastata), a globally threatened species
Lesser adjutant (Leptoptilos javanicus), a globally threatened species
Long-tailed shrike (Lanius schach tricolor)
Oriental darter (Anhinga melanogaster)
Pied kingfisher (Ceryle rudis)
Red-wattled lapwing (Vanellus indicus)
Ruddy kingfisher (Halcyon coromanda)
Sarus crane (Grus antigone), a globally threatened species
Slender-billed vulture (Gyps tenuirostris), a globally threatened species
Smooth-coated otter (Lutrogale perspicillata), a globally threatened species
White-rumped vulture (Gyps bengalensis), a globally threatened species
Woolly-necked stork (Ciconia episcopus''), a globally threatened species

Also 18 species of fish, nine of herpetofauna and six mammalian species have been documented in and around the reservoir.

References

Further reading
 Baral, H. S. and Chaudhary, B. (2003). A list of birds recorded at Jagdishpur Reservoir, May 2003. Unpublished report submitted to Bird Conservation Nepal
 BirdLife International (2008). Species Factsheets. Available at http://www.birdlife.org. Accessed on 8 June 2008.
 Choudhary, H. and Giri, D. (2006). A list of birds recorded in Lumbini, Jagdishpur Reservoir and Khadara Phanta, November 2006. Unpublished.
 DNPWC and IUCN (2003). Information sheet on Ramsar wetlands: Jagdishpur Reservoir. Unpublished report submitted to the Ramsar Convention Bureau.
 
 HMGN/MFSC (2003). National wetland policy 2003. Kathmandu: Ministry of Forest and Soil Conservation, His Majesty's Government of Nepal.
 Inskipp, C. and Inskipp, T. (1991). A guide to the birds of Nepal, Second edition. London: Christopher Helm.
 Inskipp, T., Lindsey, N. and Duckworth, W. (1996). An annotated checklist of the birds of the Oriental region. Sandy, U.K.: Oriental Bird Club.
 IUCN Nepal (2004). A review of the status and threats to wetlands in Nepal. Kathmandu: IUCN Nepal.

External links
 The Ramsar Convention on Wetlands: The Annotated Ramsar List of Nepal

Lakes of Lumbini Province
Ramsar sites in Nepal
Protected areas established in 2003